The Not Dead Yet Tour (also known as Not Dead Yet Live! and Still Not Dead Yet Live!) was a concert tour by English recording artist Phil Collins, named after his autobiography released on 25 October 2016.

Background

Collins announced the tour on 17 October 2016 at a press conference held at the Royal Albert Hall in London. The tour is due to include five concerts at the venue, and five each at the Lanxess Arena in Cologne and at the AccorHotels Arena in Paris. On 8 November 2016, news of Collins's headline spot at a concert at London's Hyde Park was announced. On 16 December 2016, it was announced that Collins would play at Dublin's Aviva Stadium on Sunday 25 June 2017. On 27 February 2017, it was announced that Collins would play at Liverpool's Echo Arena on Friday 2 June 2017. On 8 June 2017, it was announced that Collins's cancelled concerts on 8 and 9 June would be rearranged for 26 and 27 November. The two concerts had been cancelled after Collins had tripped over a step in the bedroom of his London hotel (and had been taken to hospital) following a concert at the Royal Albert Hall on 7 June.

Due to ongoing nerve problems with his hands, this was the first tour where Collins did not play drums at any point in the show. Instead, he employed his son Nicholas to handle all drum parts. However, Collins did use a cajón during later parts of the tour.

Setlist

"Against All Odds"
"Another Day in Paradise"
"One More Night" (Played on the European leg)
"Wake Up Call" (Played in Liverpool until São Paulo)
"Throwing It All Away" (Played on the Latin American leg, on the North American leg, on the Oceanian leg, on the second European leg and on the United States leg) 
"Follow You Follow Me"
"Can't Turn Back the Years" (Played on the European leg, on the North American leg and on the Oceanian leg) 
"I Missed Again"
"Hang in Long Enough"
"Don't Lose My Number" (Played on the second European leg and on the United States leg)
"Separate Lives"
"Inside Out" (Played on the Oceanian leg)
"Only You Know and I Know" / "Who Said I Would"
"You'll Be in My Heart" (Played on the North American leg)
Intermission 
Drum Duet (played on the European leg by Nicholas Collins and Luis Conte) / Drum Trio (played on the North American leg, on the Oceanian leg, on the second European leg and on the United States Leg by Nicholas Collins, Richie "Gajate" Garcia and Phil, who joins in on the cajon at the second part)
"I Don't Care Anymore" (Played on the European leg)
"Something Happened on the Way to Heaven"
"You Know What I Mean" (Played on the European leg, on the North American leg, on the Oceanian leg, on the second European leg and on the United States leg)
"In the Air Tonight"
"You Can't Hurry Love"
"Dance Into the Light"
"Invisible Touch"
"Easy Lover"
"Sussudio"
"Take Me Home"

Tour dates

Tour band

Phil Collins – lead vocals, percussion  (during the Drum Trio since the North American leg) 
Leland Sklar – bass
Daryl Stuermer – lead guitar
Ronnie Caryl – rhythm guitar, backing vocals
Nic Collins – drums, piano (on You Know What I Mean)
Brad Cole – keyboards, musical director
Arnold McCuller – backing vocals  (except the Paris, Dublin and Hyde Park dates) 
Amy Keys – backing vocals
Bridgette Bryant – backing vocals
Lamont van Hook – backing vocals
Luis Conte – percussion  (except the Dublin and Hyde Park dates and until the North American leg) 
Richie "Gajate" Garcia – percussion  (for the Dublin and Hyde Park dates and since the North American leg) 
Vine Street Horns
Harry Kim – trumpet
Dan Fornero – trumpet
George Shelby – alto saxophone
Luis Bonilla – trombone

Attendance
Pollstar 2017 mid-year: UK/Europe Tour (4 cities/16 shows): 166,204 tickets sold
Pollstar Year End 2017: UK/Europe Tour (12 cities/24 shows): 284,152 tickets sold
Pollstar: Latin America Tour 2018 ( 12 cities / 14 shows ):  352,285 tickets sold ( Gross: $38 million in U.S. dollars, with an average of $3.17 million per market )
Pollstar Year End 2018 ( Nov. 23, 2017 through Nov. 21, 2018 ): 32 cities/34 shows with 606,694 tickets sold ( Gross: $75,5 Million )
Pollstar Year End North American Tour 2018 ( 19 cities/20 shows )  263,105 tickets sold ( Gross: $38 Million ).

Support Act
Blondie + Mike and The Mechanics: Dublin, Aviva Stadium 
Blondie + Mike and The Mechanics + Starsailor: London, Hyde Park, British Summer Time Festival 2017
The Pretenders: Latin America Tour 2018 
Mike and The Mechanics: Vienna, Austria + Lyon, France + Stuttgart & Berlin, Germany + Aarhus, Denmark + Bergen, Norway ( Europe Tour 2019 )
Sheryl Crow: Stockholm, Sweden + Hannover ( 2 shows ), Germany + Zürich, Switzerland + Nijmegen, Netherlands + Cologne ( 2 shows ), Germany ( Europe Tour 2019 )
Douwe Bob: Nijmegen, Netherlands
Chic and Nile Rodgers: Warsaw, Poland ( Europe 2019 )
Wet Wet Wet: Munich, Germany ( Europe 2019 )

Notes

References

2017 concert tours
2018 concert tours
2019 concert tours
Phil Collins concert tours